is a Japanese former professional baseball pitcher, and current first squad pitching coach for the Fukuoka SoftBank Hawks of Nippon Professional Baseball (NPB).

He previously played for the Chunichi Dragons and the Fukuoka Daiei Hawks.

Early baseball career
Saito went on to Aoyama Gakuin University, where he went 8-3 in the spring of his senior year and was named best pitcher and best nine.

Professional career

Active player era
On November 20, 1985, Saito was drafted by the Chunichi Dragons in the 1985 Nippon Professional Baseball draft.

During the Chunichi era, he pitched in 24 games in four seasons from 1986 to 1989, going a 0-1 Win–loss record with an ERA of 8.64.

After retirement
Saito retired and became the pitching coach for the Fukuoka Daiei Hawks in the 2001 season, having previously served as the first squad pitching coach, second squad pitching coach, and rehabilitation coach.

He's been the first squad pitching coach since the 2022 season.

References

External links

 Career statistics - NPB.jp 
 73 Manabu Saito PLAYERS2022 - Fukuoka SoftBank Hawks Official site

1963 births
Living people
Aoyama Gakuin University alumni
Japanese baseball players
Chunichi Dragons players
Fukuoka Daiei Hawks players
Nippon Professional Baseball pitchers
Baseball people from Ibaraki Prefecture
Japanese baseball coaches
Nippon Professional Baseball coaches